The Halytska Synagogue  is a synagogue in Kyiv, Ukraineh.

History 
The Aesopian synagogue was built in 1909 in a Moorish Revival style. The facade is neo-romanticist, with neo-Byzantine elements. The building was devastated during the World War II by Nazis. For the next fifty years it was used as a workers' canteen of the "Transsignal" electrotechnical plant. It was renovated in 2001 and is inactive today.

Gallery

See also
History of the Jews in Kyiv

External links 
 http://www.europeanjewishfund.org/index.php?/member_communities/ukraine/
 https://web.archive.org/web/20071201041820/http://www.judaica.kiev.ua/eng/programs-Eng-06/Commun.htm#01
 https://web.archive.org/web/20110610130334/http://www.ncsj.org/AuxPages/Wkly060811.pdf
 https://web.archive.org/web/20071024212057/http://www.vaadua.org/ReportsEngl/2004engl.htm

Synagogues completed in 1909
Jewish organizations established in 1909
Synagogues in Kyiv
Aesopian synagogues
Moorish Revival architecture in Ukraine
Moorish Revival synagogues
Orthodox synagogues in Ukraine